Paul Noone (born ) is an English former professional rugby league footballer who played as a goal-kicking  and  in the 2000s and 2010s. He played at club level in the Super League for the Warrington Wolves, and the Harlequins RL, and in the Co-operative Championship for the Widnes Vikings (where in 2007 he scored 5 tries in 22 games), the Barrow Raiders and Oldham.

Noone was born in Widnes, Cheshire. He has been noted for his ability to break a tackle, whilst his defence is also highly regarded.

References

External links
Barrow Raiders profile
Widnes profile

1981 births
Living people
Barrow Raiders players
English rugby league players
London Broncos players
Oldham R.L.F.C. players
Rugby league centres
Rugby league five-eighths
Rugby league hookers
Rugby league locks
Rugby league players from Widnes
Rugby league second-rows
Rugby league wingers
Warrington Wolves players
Widnes Vikings players